Team Epic is a Canadian television and web series consisting of four 40-minute episodes that began broadcasting in 15-minute segments on the show's official website in October 2007. In 2009 the show was picked up and began airing weekly on the digital cable network BiteTV in a similar 15-minute format. Following a ragtag band of Canadian superheroes, the show itself is filled with iconic Canadian imagery and Silver Age of Comic Books references. Obvious visual influences can be seen between the show's lead character, Captain Epic, and traditional Canadian superheroes, Captain Canuck, Guardian and Northguard.

Plot
According to the show's official website the plot is described as;
"Set in and around the streets of downtown Toronto, Team Epic is a fast-paced live action comedy that provides an original look into the everyday lives of superheroes and how they become the figures we know and revere."

Cameos
Actor Scott Leaver, who played Omniscient the Alien on the show, has also appeared as Omniscient on the television show InnerSPACE aired on Canada's Space Network/CTV as a gag interviewee.

Reception
The show received generally mixed reviews. While concept and production value were generally praised, the show suffered from poor writing and inconsistent tone.

Andrew Pulsifer of the Torontoist wrote,

"A lot of people are going to be asking if it’s any good, but you know what? We’re not going to pass harsh judgment. It’s cute, quaint, and while the acting and production values and script may be lacking in some areas, they are no worse than certain other Canadian dramas aired on national television. Torontoist also thinks it would be really enjoyed by kids. (Although a character says "douche" at one point. Can kids hear the word "douche"? Is "mommy, what’s a douche?" too awkward a question for parents? Consider yourself warned.)"

Marilyn Campbell at About.com wrote,

"The show is far from perfect, but with episode two already ironing out some of the rough edges from episode one, the series certainly has promise (now if they can just get from "amusing" to "laugh-out-loud funny" they should be set)."

On the more negative side, Jordan Bimm of The Varsity wrote,

"Style kicks the ass of substance in this showdown. The writing team, wardrobe designer and acting coach (if there even is one) have got to go if there is to be any future for Team Epic."

References

Canadian comedy-drama web series